Gubałówka is a mountain in the Gubałówka Range (Polish: Pasmo Gubałowskie or Pogórze Gubałowskie), above the Polish town of Zakopane. The mountain is a popular tourist attraction, offering commanding views of the Tatras and Zakopane. 
In 1938 the Gubałówka Hill funicular connected Zakopane and the top of Gubałówka.
The chair lift to Butorowy Wierch was opened in 1977.

The Zakopane-Gubałówka transmitter (Polish: RTON Gubałówka) is located atop the mountain.

Mountains of Poland
Landforms of Lesser Poland Voivodeship
Tourist attractions in Lesser Poland Voivodeship